The 2014–15 season was Arsenal's 23rd season in the Premier League and 96th consecutive season in the top flight of English football. This season Arsenal participated in the Premier League, FA Cup, League Cup, Community Shield and the UEFA Champions League. In the League an inconsistent first half of the season ended any realistic hopes for the title as Arsenal only won two out of their first eight games, with numerous injuries to important players. At one stage, Arsenal were as low as eighth heading into early December. In the second half of the season their form recovered massively, which included an eight-game winning run between February and April.

In Europe, despite being widely expected to reach the quarter-finals, being favourites in the Round of 16 tie against AS Monaco, Arsenal surprisingly losing the first leg 3–1, a scoreline which ultimately proved fatal over the course of the tie as despite a 2–0 away win, Arsenal were knocked out via away goals in the Round of 16 for the fifth consecutive year. However, Arsenal reclaimed the FA Cup, thus becoming the most successful club in the history of the competition with twelve wins, comfortably beating Aston Villa 4–0 in the final. Arsenal finished the league season in third, thereby qualifying directly to Champions league group stage and avoiding the Champions League qualifier, something Arsène Wenger was keen to avoid as he felt it had a negative impact on competing for the Premier League title, which was the primary target set by the players, manager and coaching staff, going into the next season.

Review

Background
There were changes with both kit manufacturers and ticket prices with Arsenal this season as it marked the inaugural season in which the kits were manufactured by German sportswear company Puma, after a 20-year association with Nike came to an end. The deal was worth an estimated £170 million over five years in a deal that will become the most lucrative kit manufacturer deal in English football to date. Arsenal had announced the partnership with Puma will be effective from 1 July 2014. In addition, Arsenal announced an increase in their ticket prices of 3% in line with inflation, despite boasting some of the highest ticket prices of English football clubs. The changes marked only the third change to ticket prices within nine years. In January 2013, Metropolitan Police had helped Arsenal stewards remove a banner from Manchester City fans that were protesting high ticket prices.

Pre-season
On 27 March 2013, Arsenal announced plans to play a single pre-season friendly against the New York Red Bulls of Major League Soccer (MLS) in the United States, for the club's first trip to the U.S. in 25 years. The match took place at the home ground for former Gunner Thierry Henry, the Red Bull Arena, on 26 July 2014, and was the only match to be played outside of Europe for Arsenal this pre-season, subsequently marking the end of three successive Asia tours for the Gunners. The match ultimately ended in a 1–0 loss following a first-half close-range strike from the son of Arsenal legend Ian Wright, Bradley Wright-Phillips. The result was the first win for an MLS side in eight attempts against an English opposition in the summer to date.

On 2 May, Arsenal announced the line-up for the 2014 Emirates Cup, an annual tournament held at the Emirates Stadium. The tournament will consist of Arsenal (the hosts), Spanish side Valencia (who last participated in inaugural Emirates Cup), Portuguese side Benfica and Ligue 1 outfit Monaco. Arsenal will play Benfica on 2 August 2014, followed by Monaco a day later. The winners are crowned based on points accumulated and goals scored (with shots taken being taken into account if standings remain level). The last friendly to be announced for Arsenal turned out to be the opening fixture of the pre-season schedule, with the non-World Cup participating squad members involved against Conference South side Boreham Wood. The match finished 2–0 to the Gunners following second half strikes from Kristoffer Olsson in the 68th minute and a penalty from striker Benik Afobe in the 86th minute in what proved to be a stern test for Arsène Wenger's side. Arsenal began their Emirates Cup campaign opening to Benfica on 2 August. Starting the match with a high tempo, Arsenal found the breakthrough in the 26th minute following a goal by Yaya Sanogo, who scored his first goal in his Arsenal career, despite having 14 first team appearances last term. Arsenal continued the high tempo, and five minutes before time, Héctor Bellerín picked out Joel Campbell, who struck a volley past goalkeeper Artur to give Arsenal a two-goal advantage. Sanogo soon completed his hat-trick by netting twice in the space of as many minutes, as he first rolled into an empty net and then prodded past Artur after being picked out from the left by Kieran Gibbs. Arsenal entered half time with a 4–0 lead, and looked sure to progress further into the competition. Four minutes after the restart and Sanogo had his fourth, with Artur spilling a low drive from Ramsey into his path before calmly slotting home. However, Benfica pulled one back just past the hour mark, with a long throw from Maxi Pereira touched on for Nicolás Gaitán to nod in from close range, but Arsenal managed to progress after a busy afternoon in North London, with the match showcasing the debuts of Chilean Alexis Sánchez from the bench, along with Wenger opting to start £16 million signing Calum Chambers.

Arsenal's second game in the Emirates Cup was against Ligue 1 runners up Monaco. Wenger fielded a 4–3–3 formation, which saw the introduction of first team names Wojciech Szczęsny, Laurent Koscielny, Jack Wilshere, Santi Cazorla and Olivier Giroud into the side. Summer signings Sánchez and Chambers started the match, which also served as the debut for £12 million signing Mathieu Debuchy. Arsenal had needed only a draw to claim the Emirates Cup and entered the game looking for that draw. However, Monaco were gifted the only goal of the match in the 37th minute when Radamel Falcao was given the freedom of the Arsenal penalty area to head home João Moutinho's free-kick, awarded for Wilshere's clumsy lunge on Nabil Dirar, a challenge that booked the English midfielder. Having won 5–1 against Benfica 24 hours earlier, Arsenal struggled against the French side and created little in the way of clear-cut chances. Sánchez played on both flanks and then through the middle in the second period before being withdrawn in the 74th minute. Following the introduction of Chuba Akpom into the side, Arsenal showed direct running and looked for an equaliser. Akpom, who replaced Sánchez, was brought down by Monaco goalkeeper Danijel Subašić as Akpom burst into the box, only for referee Martin Atkinson to award a free-kick rather than a penalty — despite replays showing the foul was clearly inside the area. The game finished 1–0 to Monaco, and with Valencia winning 3–1 against Benfica earlier that day, the Spanish side won the trophy.

Aside from on-field preparations for this season, on 30 May, Arsenal announced that manager of 18 years, Arsène Wenger, had signed a new deal that would keep him at the club until 2017, marking his 21st year as Arsenal manager should he fulfil the full contract length. Having a Champions League-entry record matched only by Real Madrid and the experience of 1,010 matches prior to the new contract as Arsenal manager, chairman Sir Chips Keswick, commentated on how Wenger "has established Arsenal for its exciting playing style around the world", and that he has "no doubt [Arsenal] have an exciting future ahead of [them] with him leading the team". Amongst his honours are three league titles, five FA Cups and four Charity/Community Shields, including two league and cup doubles in 1998 and 2002. He was also the only Arsenal manager to win more than one FA Cup (having recently become the joint most successful manager of the competition with Sir Alex Ferguson with five wins) and take the club to a Champions League Final.

Transfers
On 29 May 2014, a little over a fortnight from the end of the previous season, cup-winning goalkeeper Łukasz Fabiański departed for Welsh club Swansea City upon the completion of his contract, citing his need to be a first-choice keeper given the stage of his career the Pole was entering. Fabiański left with 78 appearances and 25 clean sheets for Arsenal, as well as a winner's medal on his final appearance for the club. The 2014 FA Cup Final also turned out to be the final appearance for Bacary Sagna for Arsenal, as he agreed to join Manchester City upon the completion of his contract. Sagna had an illustrious seven-year period with the club, making 284 appearances for club with the Frenchman becoming an integral part of the Arsenal defence following his transfer from Auxerre. Unfortunately, Sagna did have to respond to distaste from some club supporters over the nature of his move to a Premier League rival, citing the move on the need to boost his career as a player, as opposed to the monetary incentives claimed.

Furthermore, on 26 June, Arsenal announced that 11 players were to depart the club upon their contract expiration on 30 June. The most notable players leaving that were not previously documented included Nicklas Bendtner, who made 169 appearances during his nine-year stint at the club, scoring 47 goals, including the winner against Ipswich Town that took the Gunners to the 2011 League Cup Final and the sole Arsenal goal in a 4–1 loss at the Camp Nou against Barcelona. In addition, Park Chu-young left the club having made seven appearances in three years that included two-year-long loans spells to Celta de Vigo and Watford. He scored a single goal for the club in a League Cup tie against Bolton Wanderers. Emiliano Viviano and Kim Källström both departed the club following the expiration of their loan deals, returning to parent clubs Palermo and Spartak Moscow respectively. Lastly, Real Sociedad confirmed Arsenal had sold their remaining contractual rights on Carlos Vela for a fee believed to be around £12 million. This enabled Real Sociedad to have full control over the player's contract, relinquishing any ability for Arsenal to buy Vela for a pre-determined fee.

Amongst the 11 player departures were four reserve-team players after they too reached the end of their current contracts. The most notable departing player was Chuks Aneke whose development was somewhat hindered by the lack of first-team action. As a result, he joined Zulte Waregem on a Bosman free transfer citing the Belgian style of play as his deciding factor. The remaining players whose contracts were not renewed included Daniel Boateng, Leander Siemann, Zak Ansah and Zach Fagan, the latter two joining Charlton Athletic and Welling United respectively.

Arsenal announced their first signing on the eve of their kit launch with the much-anticipated Chilean forward Alexis Sánchez joining the club on a long-term contract from Barcelona for an undisclosed fee, thought to be around £35 million. It was the second largest transfer fee the club had paid for a single player at the time of the transfer and was the marquee signing fans had been calling for. With the ability to play in many positions, manager Wenger praised the added "power, creativity and much quality" the player would add to the squad, with Sánchez himself praising the manager, squad and fan support. A week later, the club announced the signing of French international Mathieu Debuchy from Newcastle United for an undisclosed fee thought to be around £12 million. He became a direct replacement for the departing Bacary Sagna and in turn was the second signing of the summer transfer window for Arsenal. On 27 July, the club announced the signing of Colombian goalkeeper David Ospina from French club Nice for an undisclosed fee, reported to be around £3 or 4 million. A replacement for the departing Łukasz Fabiański, he was also signed to compete with Wojciech Szczęsny for the number one spot. He became Arsenal's third first team signing bringing the total money spent above the spendings of the previous season.

Shortly afterwards, the club announced their fourth summer addition of promising defender Calum Chambers from Southampton for an undisclosed fee thought to be around £11 million, rising to a potential £16 million with performance-related add ons. Although he was brought on promise due his age of 19, he is able to play in the right back, centre-back and defensive midfield positions which presented Wenger a risk he was willing to take. Chambers himself said that Arsenal's playing style is what attracted him to the club, as well as the chance to compete with the top sides in Europe.

August
Arsenal began their season with the Community Shield against Manchester City. The Gunners won the match 3–0, with goals from Santi Cazorla, Aaron Ramsey and Olivier Giroud. The trophy was Arsène Wenger's 13th in 17 years of being in charge of Arsenal.

The Premier League began at home for Arsenal in a London derby at home to Crystal Palace. The visitors took the lead through Brede Hangeland's header from a corner in the 35th minute, but Arsenal replied with goals from Laurent Koscielny and Aaron Ramsey to make the final scoreline 2–1 to Arsenal.

Arsenal began their European campaign with a trip to Turkey in the Champions League qualifying match against Beşiktaş. Aaron Ramsey was sent-off in a match which ended in a 0–0 draw.

Arsenal continued their Premier League campaign with their first away game which was against Everton at Goodison Park, where Arsenal came from 2–0 down to draw 2–2. During the match, Olivier Giroud, who scored in this corresponding match, picked up an injury and was forced to miss out for approximately four months.

On 27 August, Arsenal managed to progress to the Champions League group stage with a narrow 1–0 victory against Beşiktaş at the Emirates with Alexis Sánchez scoring his first goal for the club. Mathieu Debuchy was sent off during the match after getting a second yellow card.

Their Premier League campaign continued with a disappointing 1–1 away draw against promoted team Leicester City on 31 August with Sánchez scoring his first league goal for Arsenal.

September
On Transfer Deadline Day, Arsenal announced the signing of Manchester United striker Danny Welbeck on a "long-term deal", for a reported £16m. The Arsenal signing of Welbeck was the subject to the completion of regulatory formalities and would be enough to replace the injured Olivier Giroud, although Arsenal were not expected to sign a replacement for Giroud before the deal was made. Welbeck was assigned the number 23 shirt, previously worn by Nicklas Bendtner who moved to the German team Wolfsburg after the expiration of his Arsenal contract.

On 13 September, Arsenal played at home to defending league champions, Manchester City, a game in which Danny Welbeck made his Arsenal debut. The match ended 2–2 with goals from Jack Wilshere and Alexis Sánchez. The match also featured Mathieu Debuchy limping out with an injury that would rule him out for three months. Three days later, Arsenal played their first match in the group stage of the Champions League, which was a 2–0 away defeat to Borussia Dortmund, that saw Arsenal outclassed and outplayed by German opposition. Arsenal went back in form on 20 September with a comfortable 3–0 away victory against Aston Villa, with Welbeck scoring his first goal for the club, along with a goal from Mesut Özil and an own goal from Aston Villa defender Aly Cissokho. Their next league game was the North London derby against Tottenham Hotspur at the Emirates. Nacer Chadli gave Tottenham the lead but Alex Oxlade-Chamberlain's first goal of the season ensured a 1–1 draw.

October
Arsenal were back in action in the Champions League with their second group stage game on 1 October. They played against Turkish opponents, Galatasaray at the Emirates which concluded as a 4–1 victory with Danny Welbeck scoring his first hat trick of his senior career. Wojciech Szczęsny was red carded during the match and was forced to miss the upcoming third group stage game. On 5 October, Arsenal suffered their first league defeat of the season as they were beaten by eventual league winners Chelsea 2–0 at Stamford Bridge meaning that Arsène Wenger had not beaten José Mourinho in 12 attempts.

Arsenal continued their Premier League campaign without their playmaker Mesut Özil who was ruled out for three months with an injury. Arsenal played against Hull at home and the match ended with a disappointing 2–2 draw. Alexis Sánchez gave the hosts the lead but Hull quickly equalized through Mohamed Diamé who appeared to have fouled Mathieu Flamini before he scored and Danny Welbeck's late goal ensured a frustrating draw after Hull had taken the lead 30 seconds into the second half. Four days later, Arsenal went for a trip to Belgium for their third Champions League group stage match against Anderlecht where Arsenal's third choice goalkeeper Emiliano Martínez made his Champions League debut, in replacement for suspended Wojciech Szczęsny and injured David Ospina. The match was also held on Arsène Wenger's birthday. The Gunners produced a poor performance during the match and it looked set to be a dismal day for Wenger when Anderlecht took the lead in the 71st minute. But Kieran Gibbs and substitute Lukas Podolski scored in the final minutes of the game to seal a 2–1 victory. Their next game, on 25 October, was a league game away against Sunderland which resulted in a 2–0 win, with Alexis Sánchez capitalising on mistakes made by Wes Brown and former Arsenal goalkeeper, Vito Mannone.

November
The next league game for Arsenal saw them dispatch Burnley in a 3–0 home victory with Alexis Sánchez scoring twice and taking his tally to ten goals in his first season with the club. Theo Walcott came off the bench after recovering from his injury last season. After the game Arsène Wenger compared Sánchez with Luis Suárez during his post match interview. Arsenal's threw away two leads in the space of week in both the Champions League and Premier League. At home to Anderlecht a penalty from Mikel Arteta, and goals from Sanchez and Alex Oxlade-Chamberlain saw Arsenal storm into a 3–0 lead, but Anderlecht pulled three back to share the points, courtesy of a goal from Aleksandar Mitrovic and an Anthony Vanden Borre double. Five days later, Arsenal would throw away a 1–0 lead (after Sanchez turned in a Danny Welbeck pass) against Swansea City to lose 2–1.

On 22 November, Arsenal's first home defeat saw them lose successive Premier League games for the first time in the season. The returning Olivier Giroud's late shot proved consolation after an own goal from Kieran Gibbs and a finish by Wayne Rooney saw Arsenal defeated 2–1 by a depleted Manchester United side, including inexperienced players such as Paddy McNair and Tyler Blackett. The defeat not only dented Arsenal's Premier League title hopes, but saw Jack Wilshere injured, sidelining the midfielder for five months. Four days later, Arsenal progressed to the next round of the Champions League with a convincing 2–0 home win against Dortmund. Yaya Sanogo scored his first competitive goal for Arsenal after two minutes of the game and Alexis Sánchez netted in his twelfth goal for the club. Arsenal ended the month with a tight 1–0 win at West Brom, courtesy of a Danny Welbeck header.

December
On 3 December, Arsenal played at home with a tricky 1–0 win against Southampton, decided by an 89th minute Alexis Sánchez finish, his 13th goal in total for the club. Three days later, Arsenal played against Stoke City away from home and lost 3–2. Peter Crouch gave Stoke the lead after only 19 seconds of the match, Bojan doubled Stoke's lead and Jon Walters added a third before half time. Arsenal came back in the second half. Santi Cazorla scored from a penalty and Aaron Ramsey volleying in from a Santi Cazorla corner. Calum Chambers was sent off after getting a second yellow card and with ten men, Arsenal could not find an equalizer. Fans took their frustrations out on the team in a local subway, with several fans berating manager Arsene Wenger.

On 9 December Arsenal bounced back with a 4–1 away win against Galatasaray in the final game of the group stage of the Champions League and during the match, Aaron Ramsey scored a double, including a tremendous 35-yard left-footed volley in the 29th minute, while Lukas Podolski scored what proved to be his two last goals for the club against the club he'd sign for the following summer. Mathieu Debuchy also returned to the starting line-up after three months out with his injury. Arsenal progressed to the next round of the Champions league as the runners-up of their group, being drawn against Monaco (having faced the French side in the Emirates Cup). On 13 December, Santi Cazorla scored a brace on his 30th birthday as Arsenal recorded a second successive 4–1 win, against Newcastle at Emirates Stadium. Olivier Giroud also scored a brace, showing his full fitness and his form. On 21 December, Arsenal took on Premier League strugglers Liverpool at Anfield. In the match, Philippe Coutinho gave Liverpool the lead but Debuchy's first goal for Arsenal levelled the scoring. In the second half, Giroud gave Arsenal the lead. Fabio Borini was sent off for a high kick on Santi Cazorla (a challenge that tore the Spaniard's shirt), but in the 97th minute of the match, Martin Škrtel gave Liverpool an equaliser, the match ending 2–2.

On Boxing Day, Arsenal played at home against Queens Park Rangers and won 2–1. Alexis Sánchez scored the first goal, despite missing a penalty, and Tomáš Rosický added the second after Olivier Giroud had been sent off after headbutting QPR defender Nedum Onuoha. Two days later, Arsenal ended 2014 with a 2–1 away victory over West Ham United, courtesy of a Santi Cazorla penalty and Danny Welbeck finish.

January
In their opening game of 2015, Arsenal were upset as they lost 2–0 to Southampton away from home. However, three days later, Arsenal bounced back in their FA Cup third-round game, beating Hull 2–0 at the Emirates — a repeat of the 2014 FA Cup Final from last season. Per Mertesacker rose high to head in Alexis Sánchez's corner and Sánchez, himself, scored the second goal, thus progressing to the fourth round of the FA Cup as they hope to defend their FA Cup title from last year. On 11 January, Arsenal played their next league game which was at home to Stoke. Arsenal won 3–0 with Sánchez being involved in all three goals, assisting Laurent Koscielny's header and scoring the two remaining goals to seal a comfortable victory. The match itself saw decent performances from Arsenal players who were used successfully for experimentation such as Francis Coquelin, Héctor Bellerín and goalkeeper David Ospina who would take over as Arsenal's Premier League first choice keeper for the rest of the season. The match also saw Mesut Özil coming on as a 72nd-minute substitute, having returned from his injury.

On 18 January, Arsenal played against the league champions Manchester City away from home at the Etihad Stadium and convincingly beat them 2–0. Santi Cazorla converted a penalty and Olivier Giroud headed in from Santi Cazorla's free kick. The win at Manchester City was the turning point of Arsenal's season as Arsène Wenger confirmed this victory as the best performance of their season. On 25 January, Arsenal were in FA Cup action for the fourth round, playing against Brighton & Hove Albion away from home and prevailed 3–2 with goals from Theo Walcott, Mesut Özil and Tomáš Rosický, thus making it to the fifth round.

Transfers
Arsenal agreed to send two first team players on loan in the January transfer window. On 5 January, Arsenal sent Lukas Podolski on loan to Internazionale for the remainder of the season. Podolski made only two starts and scored only three goals during the season, including a brace in a 4–1 away victory against Galatasaray in the Champions League group stage. Elsewhere, on 13 January Arsenal sent Yaya Sanogo on loan to Crystal Palace for the remainder of the season. Sanogo scored only one goal for Arsenal, against Borussia Dortmund in the 2–0 Champions League home victory.

On 21 January, Arsenal announced a minor signing of 17-year-old Polish teenager Krystian Bielik from Polish club Legia Warsaw for a reported £2.4 million transfer fee. The deal was said to be only subject to the completion of regulatory processes.

On 28 January, Arsenal announced the signing of Brazilian centre-back Gabriel from La Liga side Villarreal for an undisclosed fee, reported to be £11.2 million. Gabriel is capable of playing as centre-back and he is also able to play as full-back. He was given the number 5 shirt, previously worn by Thomas Vermaelen, who had been signed by Barcelona during the pre-season. In addition, Arsenal's Costa Rican striker Joel Campbell moved to Villarreal on loan, the day before Gabriel signed for Arsenal. Therefore, the loan signing of Campbell to the Spanish club was in exchange for Gabriel to transfer to Arsenal.

February
The first day of February saw Arsenal dispatch Aston Villa 5–0 at home with goals from Olivier Giroud, Mesut Özil, Theo Walcott, a penalty from Santi Cazorla and a first goal in professional football from Héctor Bellerín. The overall performance was perfect preparation for their North London Derby league match against Tottenham at White Hart Lane. However, Arsenal then lost in that North London derby match on 7 February. Özil gave Arsenal a 1–0 lead but two goals from Harry Kane turned the match on its head as Tottenham won the London derby 2–1.

On 10 February, Arsenal beat Leicester City 2–1 at the Emirates. Five days later, Arsenal began their FA Cup fifth round match at home against Middlesbrough (who knocked out Manchester City in the fourth round). Arsenal beat Middlesbrough 2–0, with two goals both scored by Olivier Giroud. It was also a match in which Gabriel made his debut for the club. Arsenal would go on to face Manchester United in the quarter-finals of this FA Cup. In the next penultimate weekend of league football, Arsenal travelled to the south of London and beat Crystal Palace 2–1.

On 25 February, Arsenal played in the next round of the Champions League, after proceeding from the group stage as the runners-up. They played in the first leg at home against French club Monaco. Arsenal were handed a favourable draw when they were tied against the Ligue 1 side during the draw for this round and were highly expected to comfortably make it through the quarter-finals, considering that Monaco were perceived as an easy team to beat. However, an Arsenal performance that plumbed the depths of naivety and incompetence made them suffer a shock 3–1 defeat to the unsung French opposition. Geoffrey Kondogbia gave Monaco the lead when his long-range shot was deflected off Per Mertesacker. Then former Tottenham and Manchester United striker Dimitar Berbatov doubled Monaco's lead after a simple counterattack. An injury time goal from Alex Oxlade-Chamberlain gave Arsenal hope but it proved to matter not when Monaco scored again as Yannick Carrasco scored in the final minute of injury time after another counterattack. This shock defeat would send Arsenal on the brink of Champions League elimination in this round once more.

March
On 1 March Arsenal played against Everton at the Emirates. Arsenal were under pressure by their fans prior to the match after their miserable Champions League home defeat to Monaco. Nonetheless, Arsenal put their capitulation behind them as they beat Everton 2–0. The first goal came from Olivier Giroud, who struggled badly during their defeat to Monaco, missing every clear chance that came his way, but he managed to score the opening goal which delivered relief to the Arsenal fans. The second goal was scored by Tomáš Rosický after coming off the bench during the match as Arsenal were back in winning form. Three days later, Arsenal travelled to the west of London and won against QPR 2–1 with goals from Giroud and Alexis Sánchez, the latter ending a run of seven games without a goal.

On 9 March, Arsenal travelled to Old Trafford to face Manchester United in the FA Cup quarter-finals and Arsenal won 2–1. Danny Welbeck scored the winning goal to knock out his former club and send Arsenal into the semi-finals of the FA Cup for a record 28th time. Five days later, Arsenal beat West Ham 3–0 at the Emirates. Goals from Olivier Giroud, Aaron Ramsey and Mathieu Flamini were perfect preparation in order to overturn the Champions League 3–1 deficit against Monaco.

On 17 March, Arsenal took a trip to Monaco for their Champions League second leg match and needed to score at least three goals to progress to the quarter-finals of the European competition. Olivier Giroud scored the first goal of the match and Aaron Ramsey added a second. The Gunners had several other chances but could not find a third goal as the match ended 2–0, making it 3–3 on aggregate. Monaco went through to the quarter-finals due to the away goals rule as Arsenal were eliminated from the Champions League at this round for the fifth consecutive season. Their final game in March was a 2–1 away victory over Newcastle.

April
Olivier Giroud was named as the Premier League Player of the Month, having scored in all Premier League games held in March, along with Arsène Wenger being named the Premier League Manager of the Month after managing Arsenal to victory in all Premier League games in March. On 4 April, Arsenal played at home to Liverpool and convincingly thrashed them 4–1. Goals came from Héctor Bellerín, Mesut Özil, Alexis Sánchez and Player of the Month, Giroud, thus giving Arsenal a very high possibility of finishing in the top four of the league. Then on 11 April, they beat Burnley 1–0 away from home.

Seven days later, Arsenal played in their FA Cup semi-final match against Championship side Reading at Wembley and Arsenal won the match 2–1. Alexis Sánchez gave Arsenal the lead in the 39th minute and then scored himself the winner in extra-time, sending Arsenal into the final of the FA Cup for a record 19th time. Eight days later, Arsenal played at home to Chelsea for their next league game. The match ended as a 0–0 draw, thus ending Arsenal's winning run of eight league games.

May

Despite having the run of triumphs ended, Arsenal got back to winning ways when a first half double from Alexis Sanchez, coupled with Ramsey's deflected strike, earned them a 3–1 victory away to Hull City. However, they then suffered just their second league defeat at home this season, when Bafetimbi Gomis's late strike earned Swansea City a shock 1–0 win in North London, before Arsenal made the trip to Manchester United to play out a critical match in the top-three race. With both sides already into next seasons UEFA Champions League, Arsenal were looking to seal third place with a win, but could only manage a 1–1 draw, courtesy of Tyler Blackett's own goal late on, cancelling out Ander Herrera's early opener. Victory over Sunderland would achieve third position, but neither side could break the deadlock in a lull goalless draw at the Emirates Stadium.

And so the Gunner's had to defeat West Bromwich Albion to secure third on the final day of the season, and a first-half hat-trick from Theo Walcott, coupled with Jack Wilshere's stunning strike, had Arsenal cruising 4–0 at the break. Despite Gareth McAuley reducing the deficit to 4–1 at full-time, Arsenal did enough to secure third. Meanwhile, Wilshere then won the BBC Goal of the Season for the second season running, despite much criticism over him claiming the award.

Arsenal's final match of the campaign saw them square with Aston Villa at Wembley in the FA Cup final. Having defeated them by an "aggregate" scoreline of 8–0 in the league, the Gunners were heavy favourites in the final. After Theo Walcott put them ahead, Alexis Sanchez lashed home after the break, Per Mertesacker nodded home the third, Olivier Giroud clipped number four past goalkeeper Shay Given to wrap up an impressive 4–0 victory and a superb end to the season.

Players

Squad information

UEFA Reserve squad

Transfers

Transfers in

Loans in

Total spending:   Undisclosed (~ £85,800,000)

Transfers out

Loans out

Total incoming:   Undisclosed (~ £38,600,000)

Overall transfer activity

Spending

Summer:  Undisclosed (~ £72,200,000)

Winter:  Undisclosed (~ £13,700,000)

Total:  Undisclosed (~ £85,900,000)

Income

Summer:  Undisclosed  (~ £36,600,000)

Winter:  Undisclosed  (~ £2,000,000)

Total:  Undisclosed  (~ £38,600,000)

Net expenditure

Summer:  Undisclosed  (~ £35,600,000)

Winter:  Undisclosed (~ £11,700,000)

Total:  Undisclosed  (~ £47,300,000)

Club

Coaching staff

Kit
Supplier: Puma / Sponsor: Fly Emirates

Kit information
Puma are the new club's kit supplier this season, ending a 20-year partnership with the previous supplier Nike.
Home: The new home kit, which represented 'Forever', stayed true to the traditional red-and-white Arsenal colours that first appeared in 1933. The round-neck shirt had a red body and white sleeves and was paired with white shorts and red-and-white hooped socks. The hooped socks were inspired by Herbert Chapman, who famously changed the kit in the mid 1930s. The home kit was presented by Mikel Arteta.
Away: The new away kit, which represented 'Victorious', was designed in the yellow and navy blue colours worn by Arsenal during some of the most famous Gunners' away victories, including the FA Cup final in 1971 and 1979 wins, and the title-winning victory at Anfield in 1989. The V-neck shirt featured a yellow body with blue sleeves, blue shorts and blue-and-yellow hooped socks. The away kit was presented by Santi Cazorla.
Third: The new third kit, which represented 'Future', was worn by Arsenal away from home in cup competitions, including the Champions League and FA Cup. It featured a button-down collar with mid-blue and sky blue diagonally striped panels across the body and lime green detailing, combined with blue shorts and two-tone blue hooped socks. The third kit was presented by Mathieu Flamini.
Keeper: The three goalkeeper kits were based on Puma's Statement template, which featured a unique all-over print. The first-choice goalkeeper kit was mainly black, while there were lime green and orange alternatives as well.

Other information

Squad statistics

Appearances and goals
Key

No. = Squad number

Pos. = Playing position

Nat. = Nationality

Apps = Appearances

GK = Goalkeeper

DF = Defender

MF = Midfielder

FW = Forward

Numbers in parentheses denote appearances as substitute. Players with number struck through and marked  left the club during the playing season.

Source:

Top scorers

Source:

Disciplinary record

Source:

Pre-season and friendlies

Last updated: 8 August 2014Source:Arsenal F.C.

Competitions

Overall

FA Community Shield

Last updated: 10 August 2014Source: Arsenal F.C.

Premier League

League table

Results summary

Results by matchday

Matches

Last updated: 24 May 2015Source: Arsenal F.C.Note: Premier League fixtures not listed due to copyright

FA Cup

Last updated: 30 May 2015Source: Arsenal F.C.

League Cup

Last updated: 23 September 2014Source: Arsenal F.C.

UEFA Champions League

Play-off round

Last updated: 27 August 2014Source: Arsenal F.C.

Group stage

Knockout phase

Round of 16

Last updated: 17 March 2015Source: Arsenal F.C.

Awards

Arsenal Player of the Month award

Awarded monthly to the player that was chosen by fan voting on Arsenal.com

References

Arsenal
Arsenal
Arsenal F.C. seasons